The Anti-balaka is an alliance of militia groups based in the Central African Republic in the early 21st century said to be composed primarily of Christians. However, some church leaders have contested the claimed exclusively Christian character of such groups. The Tony Blair Faith Foundation and journalist Andrew Katz have noted that animists also participate in Anti-balaka groups. 

This militia formed in the Central African Republic after the rise to power of Michel Djotodia in 2013. Amnesty International reported in 2015 that some members of anti-balaka groups have forcibly converted Muslims to Christianity. Anti-balaka groups have also kidnapped, burnt and buried alive in public ceremonies women accused of being 'witches'.

Terminology

Though "anti-balaka" is often translated as "antimachete", its origin is explained:

History
Some commentators have said that village militias formed in the 1990s to protect against highwaymen were a precursor to the Antibalaka. Unable to provide security throughout the remote areas of the country, President François Bozizé organized, self-protection groups in 2009 to combat crime on the village level; these took the name Antibalaka.

In March 2013, President Bozizé (a Christian) was overthrown by a coup during the Central African Republic Civil War by a mostly Muslim rebel coalition known as Séléka. The leader of the Séléka, Michel Djotodia, became the first Muslim president of the country. With the disbanding of the army by Djotodia, many army members joined the militia, boosting their numbers and helping train them.

Djotodia announced the dissolution of the Séléka in September 2013, but most of the militias refused to disband. The Séléka and the anti-balaka engaged in a cycle of increasing violence.

As many Christians had more settled lifestyles and many Muslims were nomadic, competing claims to the land were another dimension of the tensions. In November 2013, the UN warned that the country was at risk of spiraling into genocide, and was "descending into complete chaos". France described the country as "...on the verge of genocide". On 2 December 2013, anti-balaka militiamen are suspected to have killed 12 people, including children, and wounded 30 others in an attack on the mostly-Muslim Fula in Boali, according to the government. This was amidst the Central African Republic conflict under the Djotodia administration.

Early 2014 marked a turning point; hardened by war and massacres, the anti-balaka committed multiple atrocities. In December 2013, UNICEF reported that in sectarian violence in Bangui, at least two children were beheaded and one of them was mutilated.

2014 
In 2014, Amnesty International reported several massacres committed by anti-balaka militias against Muslim civilians, forcing thousands of Muslims to flee the country. On 13 January more than 100 people were killed by Anti-balaka in Bossemptélé massacre.

In 2014, the corpse of Camille Lepage, a missing French photojournalist, was found by French soldiers in a truck used by Anti-Balaka members.

On 24 June 100 Anti-balaka fighters attacked Bambari. 46 people were killed and 28 wounded.

2017 
On 9 May 2017 Anti-balaka attacked UPC forces in Alindao before withdrawing to Mingala. On 13 May Anti-balaka attacked Bangassou killing more than 115 people including one peacekeeper. On 18 May heavy clashes erupted between Anti-balaka and ex-Seleka in Bria resulting in 26 deaths.

2018 
On 31 October Heavy clashes broke out between anti-Balaka and ex-Séléka fighters in Batangafo resulting in at least 15 deaths.

2019 

In 2019, an Anti-balaka leader in Satema killed a 14-year-old girl in a ritualistic way to increase profit from mines.

2020 
On 3 August Anti-balaka attacked Grimari blocking roads to Sibut and Bambari. FACA managed to recapture city the same day killing one Anti-balaka commander. On 23 October Clashes erupted between two factions of Anti-balaka in Batangafo. Clashes were also reported later between Anti-balaka and ex-Séléka in the city. Seven people were killed (including three civilians and four militiamen) and more than 100 injured. On 17 December On Anti-balaka joined Coalition of Patriots for Change. On 26 December Anti-balaka fighters from Kaga-Bandoro attacked Dekoa killing three Burundian peacekeepers. Three militiamen were arrested by MINUSCA forces.

2021 
Between 6 and 16 December 2021 Anti-balaka fighters from pro-government faction killed Muslim civilians in Boyo commune for their alleged links with UPC rebels.

List of Anti-balaka leaders

See also
Central African Republic Civil War (2012–present)

References

Conflict
Factions of the Central African Republic Civil War
Rebel groups in the Central African Republic
Anti-Islam sentiment in Africa
Christian terrorism in Africa
Christianity in the Central African Republic
Animism in Africa
Violence against Muslims